Reginald Charles Digby (21 January 1879 – 16 March 1958) was an Australian rules footballer who played with Geelong in the Victorian Football League (VFL).

Notes

External links 

1879 births
1958 deaths
Australian rules footballers from Victoria (Australia)
Geelong Football Club players